Rebecca June Hewitt ( Cartwright; born 23 July 1983) is an Australian actress and singer. From 1998 to 2005, Hewitt played Hayley Smith Lawson on the soap opera Home and Away. As Bec Cartwright, Hewitt released an eponymous pop music album in 2002. In 2005, she married professional tennis player Lleyton Hewitt.

Career
Cartwright began her acting career at age 5 for television commercials. In 1992, she made her mainstream television debut on an episode of Police Rescue. She has also guest starred in Water Rats and Roar.

She won her breakout role and best-known role to date in 1998, portraying Hayley Smith Lawson on Home and Away. Cartwright became a series fan favourite and earned herself numerous Logie Award nominations until 2005. In the same year, Cartwright earned a Most Popular Actress win. She coincidentally fell pregnant within months of her 'Home and Away' character, and then left the series to become a full-time mother. For a short period of time, Ella Scott Lynch replaced her as Hayley before shortly departing the series.

In 2002, Cartwright signed a recording contract with Warner Music Australia and East West Records. Her debut single "All Seats Taken" was released 18 November 2002 and peaked at 10 on the ARIA Music Charts. Her follow-up singles "On the Borderline" and "A Matter of Time" both failed to match the same success, both charting only the Top 30. Her self-titled debut album was released on 16 June 2003 and, despite high expectations, charted only at 21 and was certified Gold. The album was met with mixed reviews, with Smash Hits giving the album two out of five stars. In 2004, Cartwright ended her partnership with Warner Music.

Cartwright was announced as a contestant in the first season of Dancing with the Stars. She and her partner Michael Miziner won the first season on 23 November 2004. The couple returned in an opening performance in a dance routine during the second-season premiere.

She hosted Abba Mania, which premiered in November 2006 on Nine Network. The special was met with controversy surrounding the fact that the only celebrity performers were Nine Network personalities. Hewitt's performance was met with largely negative reviews.

In 2018, Hewitt announced her return to television, 13 years since she left Home and Away, with the new Nine Network travel series Helloworld. The series premiered on 7 October with Hewitt hosting in Episode 1 in Queensland – Hamilton Island.

Personal life
Cartwright was born in Sydney on 23 July 1983 the youngest child of Darrel and Michelle Cartwright. She has an older brother and sister. After a four-year relationship with fellow Home and Away co-star Beau Brady, Cartwright and Brady were briefly engaged.

Soon after the end of her engagement, Cartwright began a relationship with tennis player Lleyton Hewitt. On 5 May 2005, the couple announced they were expecting their first child. The pair married on 21 July 2005; the wedding was at the Sydney Opera House, and their reception took place at Taronga Zoo. The event attracted much media attention, with Bec and Lleyton selling exclusive coverage of the day to magazine New Idea. Fellow actresses and friends Ada Nicodemou and Kate Ritchie were bridesmaids. Commemorative stubby holders were given as gifts to all guests.

On 29 November 2005, Cartwright gave birth to daughter at Sydney's North Shore Private Hospital. Before her birth, a contract was made with women's magazine Woman's Day involving regular diaries from Bec and exclusive photos and interviews of the family for the first two years of Mia's life. The couple attracted much criticism for the observation that they had effectively "sold" their daughter to the highest bidder. On 11 December 2008, Hewitt gave birth to a baby boy whom the couple named Cruz Lleyton Hewitt. Their third child, a daughter, was born on 19 October 2010. Her name was announced via a text message subscription service for the cost of $2, a move that attracted much criticism of Bec and Lleyton. 

In February 2009, after revelations about Hewitt's previously unknown offshore income and bank accounts were revealed during a legal battle with his former management company, Octagon Sports Marketing, the couple relocated to a $3.8 million home at the Old Fort Bay estate in Nassau, Bahamas.

Filmography

1998–2005: Home and Away ... Hayley Lawson No. 1
2000: Roar ... Young Catlin (1 episode)
1997: Water Rats ... School Girl (1 episode)
1992: Police Rescue ... Emma (1 episode)

Discography

Albums

Singles

References
General
Hewitts' engagement announcement by Sydney Morning Herald
 Reports from ABC (Australia) and Reuters regarding her marriage to Lleyton
 On the Borderline peak position

Specific

External links

 

1983 births
Australian expatriates in the Bahamas
Australian soap opera actresses
Dancing with the Stars (Australian TV series) winners
Living people
Logie Award winners
Actresses from Sydney
21st-century Australian singers
21st-century Australian women singers